The Medical Teacher is a monthly peer-reviewed academic journal covering educational topics for educators involved in training health professionals. It is published by Informa Healthcare in collaboration with the Association for Medical Education in Europe. The editor-in-chief is Ronald Harden. The journal is abstracted and indexed in Medline and Scopus. According to the Journal Citation Reports, the journal has a 2020 impact factor of 3.650.

References

External links 
 

Education journals
Publications established in 1979
General medical journals
Taylor & Francis academic journals
Monthly journals